Patrick J. Cummins (10 June 1921 – 5 March 2009) was an Irish Fianna Fáil politician.

He was the son of Paddy Cummins who was a baker from Pearse Street, Dublin and a sergeant in the 6th Royal Dublin Fusiliers during World War I.

He was elected to Dáil Éireann as a Fianna Fáil Teachta Dála (TD) for the Dublin South-Central constituency at the 1958 by-election caused by the resignation of the independent TD Jack Murphy. He was re-elected at the 1961 general election but lost his seat at the 1965 general election, and was an unsuccessful candidate at the 1969 and 1973 general elections.

He was a Dublin City Councillor and a governor of the Royal Irish Academy of Music. He was a member of the Royal Dublin Fusiliers Association, his father's regiment.

References

1921 births
2009 deaths
Fianna Fáil TDs
Members of the 16th Dáil
Members of the 17th Dáil
Politicians from County Dublin